The Saxon Class VIII 2 was a twin-coupled tender locomotive procured for passenger services by the Royal Saxon State Railways. In 1925, the Deutsche Reichsbahn grouped these engines into their Class 36.9-10.

History 
The design of the locomotives was derived from the Class VIII V1 express engines. As passenger locomotives the VIII V2 were given smaller coupled wheelsets, however. To distinguish them from the express engines, the new machines were give annotated with the subscript "2".

Between 1896 and 1902 118 locomotives were placed in service by the Royal Saxon State Railways. As well as their in-house suppliers, the Sächsische Maschinenfabrik in Chemnitz, Schwartzkopff in Berlin, Maschinenfabrik Esslingen and Linke-Hofmann in Breslau were involved in their manufacture.

During the First World War, No. 528 from the first construction series was lost. The engine was later operated by the Polish state railway PKP as No. Od101-1.

In 1920, the rest of the locomotives were transferred to the newly founded Deutsche Reichsbahn, who retired several examples in the early 1920s. For example, in 1925 the 111 remaining locomotives were given the new running numbers 36 901–919, 36 921–948 and 36 951–1014. With the increasing appearance of modern superheated locomotives like the Saxon XII H2, the XIV HT and the introduction of Prussian classes into Saxony these locomotives soon ended up carrying out secondary duties. The locomotives were all retired by 1931 and scrapped. Not a single example has survived.

Duties 
The locomotives preferred use was in the haulage of passenger trains on the railway lines running up into the Ore Mountains. They were also used, however, on express trains. Their smaller driving wheels gave the locomotives good acceleration and their top speed of 80 km/h was sufficient for express trains in the highlands. The locomotives were mainly operated on the lines from Chemnitz to Riesa, Annaberg and Aue, from Dresden to Görlitz and Zittau and on the Dresden to Leipzig line.

In the early 1920s, they also had to haul heavy excursion trains of up to 50 axles from Dresden into Saxon Switzerland. Finally, the engines were used for commuter services around Dresden and there are even records of them being used to haul Leig trains.

Technical details 
The boiler had a Belpaire firebox, typical of Saxon locomotives, and was located between the frame plates in the area of the firebox. The boiler was fed by two feedwater pumps made by Schäfer & Buddenberg.

The locomotive had a two-cylinder compound engine with a Walschaerts valve gear and Lindner starting system (Anfahrvorrichtung). The engine drove the first coupled axle. The front twin-axled bogie had an axle base of 2,150 mm and side play of 39 mm.

The brake was a Westinghouse compressed air brake. It acted on both sides of the coupled wheelsets. The running wheels in the bogie were unbraked.

The locomotives were coupled to tenders of Saxon Class sä 3 T 9, sä 2'2' T 16 and 2'2' T 21.

References 

 
 
 

08 V2
Sächsische Maschinenfabrik locomotives
Berliner locomotives
Esslingen locomotives
Linke-Hofmann locomotives
4-4-0 locomotives
Standard gauge locomotives of Germany
Railway locomotives introduced in 1896
2′B n2v locomotives
Passenger locomotives